Adolf Müller (May 13, 1916 – February 22, 2005) was a German politician of the Christian Democratic Union (CDU) and former member of the German Bundestag.

Life 
Müller joined the CDU in 1945 and was later elected to the state executive of the CDU Rhineland. Müller was a member of the German Bundestag from 1961 to 1987. He had always entered parliament via the North Rhine-Westphalia state list. The social policy expert was Chairman of the Bundestag Committee for Labour from 1965 to 1969 and Deputy Chairman of the Bundestag Committee for Labour and Social Affairs from 1969 to September 1981. From 1981 to 1987 he was deputy chairman of the CDU/CSU parliamentary group in the Bundestag.

Literature

References

1916 births
2005 deaths
Members of the Bundestag for North Rhine-Westphalia
Members of the Bundestag 1983–1987
Members of the Bundestag 1980–1983
Members of the Bundestag 1976–1980
Members of the Bundestag 1972–1976
Members of the Bundestag 1969–1972
Members of the Bundestag 1965–1969
Members of the Bundestag 1961–1965
Members of the Bundestag for the Christian Democratic Union of Germany